Esmailabad Rural District is a rural district (dehestan) in the Central District of Khash County, Sistan and Baluchestan province, Iran. At the 2006 census, its population was 16,940, in 3,441 families.  The rural district has 47 villages. At the 2016 census, its population was 12,709.

References 

Khash County
Rural Districts of Sistan and Baluchestan Province
Populated places in Khash County